Ivanovka is a rural locality (a village) in Arlansky Selsoviet, Krasnokamsky District, Bashkortostan, Russia. The population was 13 as of 2010. There is 1 street.

Geography 
Ivanovka is located 26 km south of Nikolo-Beryozovka (the district's administrative centre) by road. Starourazayevo is the nearest rural locality.

References 

Rural localities in Krasnokamsky District